Élisabeth Tshala Muana Muidikay (13 March 1958 – 10 December 2022), known professionally as Tshala Muana, was a singer and dancer from Congo-Kinshasa. Considered the "Queen of Mutuashi", a traditional dance music from her native Kasai region, she is often called "Mamu National”. 

Muana started her artistic career as a dancer for the musical band Tsheke Tsheke Love in 1977 before turning to singing. She is famous for several songs such as "Karibu Yangu". She toured widely overseas, won several awards on the national, continental and global scene and recorded over 20 albums. Her music has appeared in the soundtrack of the popular 1987 Congolese musical film La Vie est Belle and Aya of Yop City .

Biography
Tshala Muana was born on 13 March 1958, in Lubumbashi, then part of the Belgian Congo, now the Democratic Republic of Congo. She was the second of ten children of Amadeus Muidikayi, a soldier, and Alphonsine Bambiwa Tumba, a housewife.

In 1964, when Muana Muidikay was 6 years old, her father was murdered. She was raised by her mother, who died in 2005.

In June 2020 she was rumored to have died, but was instead hospitalized after having suffered a stroke. 

In November 2020, Muana was arrested by the National Intelligence Agency (ANR), reportedly for her song "Ingratitude", which was interpreted by many to be a veiled criticism of President Felix Tshisekedi, toward his former mentor and predecessor, President Joseph Kabila. The singer was a public supporter of former President Joseph Kabila and his party, the People's Party for Reconstruction and Democracy (PPRD).

On 10 December 2022, Tshala Muana died in Kinshasa, at the age of 64.

Discography

Albums
1982: Kangungu
1983: Tshala Muana à Paris [volumes 1 to 4]
1984: Tshala Muana
1985: M'Pokolo
1985: Kami
1988: Nasi Nabali
1988: La Divine
1988: Biduaya
1989: Munanga
1990: Tshibola
1990: Mady
1990: Tshala Muana Dans Un Duo Pour L'Éternité With Papa Wemba
1991: The Flying Star
1994: Ntambue
1996: Mutuashi
1999: Pika Pende
2003: Malu
2004: Mbombo
2009: Sikila
2016: Lunzenze

Singles and EPs
1981: "Amina" / "Tshebele"
1987: "Antidote"
1988: "Karibu Yangu"

References

External links
Tshalamuana.ifrance.com
Discography
 
Rumba on the River bio of Tshala Muana
 

1958 births
2022 deaths
20th-century Democratic Republic of the Congo women singers
21st-century Democratic Republic of the Congo women singers
People from Lubumbashi